Aldana Cometti (born 3 March 1996) is an Argentine professional footballer who plays as a centre-back for Spanish Liga F club Madrid CFF and the Argentina women's national team.

International career
Cometti scored one goal at the 2014 Copa América Femenina.

International goals
Scores and results list Argentina's goal tally first

Honors and awards

Clubs
Atlético Huila
Copa Libertadores Femenina: 2018

Personal life
Cometti is a supporter of River Plate.

References

External links

Aldana Cometti at aupaAthletic.com 

 Aldana Cometti at the 2019 Pan American Games

1996 births
Living people
Women's association football central defenders
Women's association football midfielders
Argentine women's footballers
Footballers from Buenos Aires
Argentina women's international footballers
2019 FIFA Women's World Cup players
Pan American Games silver medalists for Argentina
Pan American Games medalists in football
Footballers at the 2019 Pan American Games
South American Games gold medalists for Argentina
South American Games medalists in football
Competitors at the 2014 South American Games
Club Atlético River Plate (women) players
Boca Juniors (women) footballers
Granada CF (women) players
Atlético Huila (women) players
Primera División (women) players
Sevilla FC (women) players
Argentine expatriate women's footballers
Argentine expatriate sportspeople in Spain
Expatriate women's footballers in Spain
Argentine expatriate sportspeople in Colombia
Expatriate women's footballers in Colombia
Independiente (women) players
Medalists at the 2019 Pan American Games
Levante UD Femenino players